L. laevis  may refer to:
 Lacerta laevis, a lizard species found in Cyprus, Israel, Jordan, Lebanon, Palestine, Syria and Turkey
 Lepidobatrachus laevis, the escuerzo, Budget frog or wide-mouth frog, a frog species found in Argentina, Bolivia and Paraguay
 Lysapsus laevis, a frog species found in Bolivia, Brazil and Guyana

See also
 List of Latin and Greek words commonly used in systematic names#L